The 2017 GAA Interprovincial Championships (formerly known as the Railway Cups) are senior GAA competitions in which the four provinces of Ireland were initially scheduled  in Gaelic football and hurling. The provincial squads are made up of players from the county panels in each province.

Ulster are the reigning football champions and Munster are the reigning hurling champions from 2016.

The matches were due to be played on the weekend of 9 and 10 December 2017, but following Connacht's decision to withdraw from the competition, the ties were postponed. With no date set for the competition within the GAA's 2018 Master Fixtures plan, it was reported to be unlikely that the competition would return in the near future.

Football Championship

Football Semi-finals

Football final

Hurling Championship

Hurling Semi-finals

Hurling final

References

GAA Interprovincial Championship
I
I